Günter Rohrmoser (1927 in Bochum – 2008 in Stuttgart) was Christian conservative German social philosopher and professor at the Hohenheim University and at Stuttgart University. He was an advisor to prominent CDU politicians.

Life 
Rohrmoser studied philosophy, theology, history and economicy in Münster. One of his eminent professors at Münster University was Joachim Ritter and he became a follower of the German post war "Ritter school" of conservative philosophers.
He wrote his "Habilitation" (post-dissertation qualification to become a professor) in Cologne on the philosophy of Hegel.
From 1976 until 1996 he taught as a professor for social philosophy at Hohenheim University near Stuttgart.
Rohrmoser became a vocal critic of the neo-Marxist "critical philosophy", the Frankfurter Schule and Jürgen Habermas and the New Left of the generation of 1968. He wrote more than twenty books. Some of them have been translated into Japanese and Russian. He was awarded honors by the Russian Academy of Sciences and the Chinese Academy of Sciences.

Political advisor 

Initially, Rohrmoser was close to the Social Democrats and was a member of several commissions of the party, but then he moved to the right and became a supporter and advisor to CDU and CSU, in particular Bavarian politician Franz Josef Strauß and the Baden-Württemberg prime minister Hans Filbinger.
Later he became increasingly disillusioned with the CDU chancellor Helmut Kohl whom he accused of not achieving a true conservative moral change of tides.
In 1997 he received the "Bundesverdienstkreuz", the Order of Merit of the Federal Republic of Germany.

References 

20th-century German philosophers
German Christians
1927 births
2008 deaths
Recipients of the Order of Merit of the Federal Republic of Germany